The South African Rugby Board was the rugby union governing body of white South Africans between 1889 and 1992. The governing of white and coloured rugby union was handled separately during South Africa under Apartheid.

On the 23 March 1992 the non-racial South African Rugby Union and the South African Rugby Board were merged to form the South African Rugby Football Union. The unified body changed its name in 2005 to the current South African Rugby Union.

See also
 South African Rugby Union
 Springboks

External links
 SARU Website

Rugby union governing bodies in South Africa
Rugby union and apartheid
Defunct sports governing bodies in South Africa
Defunct rugby union governing bodies
Sports organizations established in 1889